Gennadi Viacheslavovich Krasnitski (Vanisyan) (7 September 1968) is a former Soviet pair skater. He is a two-time (1986, 1987) World Junior champion with partner Elena Leonova.

Krasnitski works as a coach at the Ice House in Hackensack, New Jersey. He coached Andrea Davidovich / Evgeni Krasnopolski, the first Israeli pair to qualify for the Winter Olympics, and Estonia's Viktoria Shklover / Valdis Mintals.

Results
Pairs with Elena Leonova

References

1968 births
Figure skaters from Moscow
Russian male pair skaters
Soviet male pair skaters
Figure skating coaches
Living people
World Junior Figure Skating Championships medalists